Enterprise Cultural Heritage (ECH) is the combination of history and products that belong to an enterprise and are recognised by the organization as a potential resource of uniqueness, innovation, and differentiation of products and services.

Enterprise Cultural Heritage shares a number of similarities with the Creative Industries, as most of the sectors addressed are the same, issues such as product differentiation and intellectual property rights management are also shared, however it has developed in new directions taking inspiration from the concept of the "extended product". Innovative practices in Lifelong Learning have been developed to support entrepreneurs, managers, and professionals in Small and Medium Enterprises to gain competitive advantage through the exploitation of their Enterprise Cultural Heritage when designing and developing products and services.

Research studies, looking at the needs of Small and Medium Enterprises demonstrate the existence of the characteristics of Enterprise Cultural Heritage in businesses (mainly related to the craft sector), describe how Enterprise Cultural Heritage is perceived in business organization in terms of practices, information, knowledge, and address the skills and competences needed to manage Enterprise Cultural Heritage.

The four aspects of Enterprise Cultural Heritage management 

The previously mentioned research studies found that Enterprise Cultural Heritage management is based upon the combination of Skills that consist of the combination of four main skill areas:

 Brand management
 Change management
 Heritage management
 Intellectual property management

For each skill area a number of competences have been identified which can help leverage the Enterprise Cultural Heritage potential of the organisation into competitive advantage. The competence mix needed is determined case by case using structured analysis and planning methodologies to help a business to gain awareness of the core elements of Enterprise Cultural Heritage and identify the heritage values attached to the business. These can then be exploited through Branding and Marketing by applying routines of continuous change in the organization and in production. The elements recognised as important elements of an enterprise’s cultural heritage can be selected, preserved and protected through a suitable Intellectual Property management policy.

The rationale of Enterprise Cultural Heritage 

A long-term commitment to the use of Enterprise Cultural Heritage can give a distinct traditional, cultural and symbolic appeal to an organisation and its products with the purpose of stimulating interest in the company and its business. A company might publish its history and vision through a web page, booklet or book aimed at its desired market segment. Communication of heritage could include the year of establishment prominently placed on the company logo, straplines etc. communicating the message of experience, longevity and reliability and the implication of quality. A company might reuse existing objects, information and procedures (e.g. recipes in the food sector) to create an artisan atmosphere (which would imply quality and distinction) for customers or encourage employee commitment to the company.

Enterprise Cultural Heritage Open Community 

An Open Community has been established so that interested parties can collaborate to develop and disseminate the  management methodologies applied to the exploitation of Enterprise Cultural Heritage in organisations.
The Enterprise Cultural Heritage Open Community was founded by academics and enterprises to shape a methodology for managing Enterprise Cultural Heritage, develop competences, and maintain and enhance the definition of Enterprise Cultural Heritage.

References

External links 
 Enterprise Cultural Heritage Open Community
 Quality & Innovation in Vocational Training for Enterprise Cultural Heritage Project website

Brand management